Aphelinus abdominalis is a parasitoid wasp and biocontrol agent used to control several aphid species that are pests of agricultural crops, including the potato aphid Macrosiphum euphorbiae.

References 

Aphelinidae
Insects used as insect pest control agents
Biological pest control wasps
Insects described in 1820